Utica is a ghost town in Smith County, located in the U.S. state of Texas.

Notes

Geography of Smith County, Texas
Ghost towns in East Texas